Yury Fyodorovich Yarov (born April 2, 1942) is a Russian politician who was a deputy prime minister from 1992 until 1996. Previously he was the 4th Executive Secretary of the Commonwealth of Independent States from 6 November 1999 to 14 July 2004

Yarov also played an important role in the leadership of Yeltsin's reelection campaign.

Honours and awards
Order of Merit for the Fatherland 4th class
Order of Honour
Order of Friendship
Order of the Red Banner of Labour
Order of the Badge of Honour
Medal Defender of a Free Russia
Jubilee Medal "300 Years of the Russian Navy"
Medal "In Commemoration of the 300th Anniversary of Saint Petersburg"
Jubilee Medal "In Commemoration of the 100th Anniversary since the Birth of Vladimir Il'ich Lenin"
Order of Prince Yaroslav the Wise (Ukraine)

References

1942 births
Living people
1st class Active State Councillors of the Russian Federation
Commonwealth of Independent States people
Recipients of the Order of Honour (Russia)
Communist Party of the Soviet Union members
Deputy heads of government of the Russian Federation